Félix Loustau (25 December 1922 – 5 January 2003) was an Argentine footballer who was a key player on the River Plate squad known as La Máquina. La Maquina is considered to be one of the greatest team ever assembled in the history of South American football. They dominated Argentine football during the first half of the 1940s, winning eight national titles during his time at the club. The five forwards on the team were Juan Carlos Muñoz, José Manuel Moreno, Adolfo Pedernera, Ángel Labruna and Loustau. He usually played as an outside left and he is considered to be one of Argentina's greatest wingers.

Because the peak of his career was during the Second World War, his international career was very limited. Nevertheless, he played 28 times for Argentina scoring ten goals.  He won the Copa América in 1945, 1946 and 1947.

Honours

Club 
 River Plate
Primera División Argentina: 1942, 1945, 1947, 1952, 1953, 1955, 1956, 1957

International 
 Argentina
Copa América: 1945, 1946, 1947

References

External links 

 

1922 births
2003 deaths
Sportspeople from Avellaneda
Argentine people of French descent
Association football wingers
Argentine footballers
Club Atlético River Plate footballers
Estudiantes de La Plata footballers
Argentine Primera División players
Argentina international footballers
Copa América-winning players